Wingate & Finchley Football Club, an association football club based in Finchley in the London Borough of Barnet, England, was founded in 1991 as a merger between Finchley and Leyton-Wingate Football Clubs. Wingate & Finchley's furthest FA Cup run saw them reach the third qualifying round four times, in 1999–2000, 2014–15, 2015–16 and 2021–22. The furthest they have reached in the FA Trophy is the second round proper in 2018–19. The club's furthest FA Vase run saw them reach the third round in the 1994–95 season.

Key

Key to divisions
 Isthmian Prem = Isthmian Premier Division
 Isthmian Div 1N = Isthmian Division One North
 Isthmian Div 2 = Isthmian Second Division
 Isthmian Div 3 = Isthmian Third Division
 South Mid Prem = South Midlands League Premier Division
 Southern Div 1E = Southern Football League Division One East

Key to positions and symbols
  = Runners-up
  = Promoted
  = Relegated
  = Transferred

Key to rounds
PRE = Preliminary round
QR = Qualifying round
QR1 = First qualifying round, etc.
R1 = First round, etc.

Seasons

Notes

References
General
 

Specific

Seasons
Wingate and Finchley